Brian Gunn (born August 23, 1970) is an American actor, producer, and screenwriter. He was raised in St. Louis, Missouri.

Early life and background
Gunn  has four brothers —  filmmaker James, actor Sean, actor and political writer Matt, producer and former Executive Vice President of Artisan Entertainment Patrick — and a sister, Beth. Their parents are Leota and James F. Gunn, a lawyer. Gunn and his brothers all attended Saint Louis University High School, where he graduated in 1988.

Career
As a writer, producer, and actor, Gunn is best known for Journey 2: The Mysterious Island (2012), Bring It On Again (2004), and 2gether (2000).

Filmography

References

External links

1970 births
Living people
Male actors from St. Louis
American male television actors
Writers from St. Louis
American producers
American male film actors